Liparura simplex is a species of earwig within the family Forficulidae, found in Bhutan and India. Males of the species are a dark reddish or yellowish-brown coloration, with a black abdomen, yellow antennae, brown basal segments, and reddish-brown legs. The forceps are cylindrical and gradually narrow, with a cruve beyond the midpoint. Females are similar to males, although the forceps are slenderer. Males are 13.5-14 millimeters in length whereas females are 14.5 millimeters in length.

References 

Insects described in 1975
Insects of Bhutan
Insects of India
Forficulidae